3 on 3 basketball was a demonstration sport at the 2007 Asian Indoor Games was held in Macau, China on 3 November 2007. The competition was the first major test of FIBA 3x3, a formalized version of the basketball variant developed earlier that year by the sport's international governing body, FIBA.

Medalists

Results

Preliminary round

Group A

Group B

Final round

3rd place match

Final

References

 2007 Asian Indoor Games official website

2007
Basketball
2007 in 3x3 basketball
2007–08 in Asian basketball
2007–08 in Chinese basketball
International basketball competitions hosted by China